Refugees (German: Flüchtlinge) is the 1933 German drama film, directed by Gustav Ucicky and starring Hans Albers, Käthe von Nagy, and Eugen Klöpfer. It depicts Volga German refugees persecuted by the Bolsheviks on the Sino-Russian border in Manchuria in 1928.

The screenplay was written by Gerhard Menzel and was based on his own novel of the same title. It was shot at the Babelsberg Studios with sets designed by the art directors Robert Herlth and Walter Röhrig.

It was the first movie to win the state prize, and Goebbels praised it as among those films that, while they did not explicitly cite National Socialist principles, nevertheless embodied its spirit, a new film reflecting the ideal of their national revolution.

The refugees are rescued by a heroic German leader much like the Führer; the symbolism is obviously intended to emulate Adolf Hitler although its hero, being blond and athletic, represented the physical ideal much more clearly. He is disgusted by "November Germany", and devotes himself to the ideal of "true Germany". He off-handedly disposes of some refugees as worthless, and demands complete obedience from all others. The death of a boy deeply devoted to him moves him, as dying for a cause is something he would wish for himself, in keeping with Nazi glorification of heroic death.

Their Communist persecutors are portrayed simply as brutal murderers, typical of works prior to the Molotov–Ribbentrop Pact (and again after its breach). The film was shown for some time after the pact, owing to bureaucratic oversight, complicating the efforts of Nazi propaganda.

The movie is mostly set in the city of Harbin, in what was at the time the Republic of China.

Cast
Hans Albers as Arneth 
Käthe von Nagy as Kristja Laudy 
Eugen Klöpfer as Bernhard Laudy 
Andrews Engelmann as The Commissar 
Fritz Genschow as Hermann, refugee-engineer 
Karl Rainer as Peter, teenage refugee 
Franziska Kinz as pregnant woman 
Ida Wüst as Frau Megele 
Veit Harlan as Mannlinger 
Karl Meixner as Pappel 
Hans Adalbert Schlettow as Siberian 
Friedrich Gnaß as Hussar 
Hans Hermann Schaufuss as Zweig 
Josef Dahmen as man with red hair 
Carsta Löck as Frau Hellerle

References

Bibliography
Giesen, Rolf. Nazi Propaganda Films: A History and Filmography. McFarland, 2003.

External links

1933 adventure films
Films based on German novels
Films directed by Gustav Ucicky
Films of Nazi Germany
Films set in 1928
Films set in China
Films set in Heilongjiang
Films set in Manchukuo
German adventure films
1930s German-language films
German multilingual films
Nazi propaganda films
Rail transport films
Volga German people
UFA GmbH films
Films shot at Babelsberg Studios
German black-and-white films
1933 multilingual films
Films critical of communism
Films about the Soviet Union in the Stalin era
1930s German films